The Canadian province of British Columbia held municipal elections on November 19, 2005. Voters in each of BC's 157 municipalities elected mayors and councillors, and rural voters elected directors for their regional district electoral area. School boards and other specialized public bodies (such as the Vancouver Park Board) have also been elected, and various local referendums are held concurrently.

Political parties and slates are a common feature of governance in some municipalities in the Metro Vancouver and Greater Victoria areas, though the rest of the province's cities and towns resemble the majority of Canada in lacking overt partisan alliances. The City of Vancouver, as well as its neighbour Richmond in particular, has an entrenched and polarized party system unique in the country.

Metro Vancouver

Burnaby

Coquitlam

Delta

Langley (city)

Langley (township)

Maple Ridge

New Westminster

North Vancouver (city)

North Vancouver (district)

Pitt Meadows

Port Coquitlam

Port Moody

Richmond

Surrey

Mayor

Councillors

Electors could vote for eight candidates. Percentages are determined in relation to the total number of votes.

Vancouver 

Sam Sullivan defeated Jim Green, and 18 other candidates, in the race for mayor.

West Vancouver

White Rock

Capital Region

Central Saanich

Colwood

Esquimalt

Langford

North Saanich

Oak Bay

Saanich

Sidney

Victoria

Up-Island

Campbell River

Comox

Courtenay

Nanaimo

North Cowichan

Port Alberni

Sunshine Coast and Sea to Sky

Powell River

Squamish

Fraser Valley

Abbotsford

Chilliwack

Mission

Thompson, Shuswap and Cariboo

Kamloops

Salmon Arm

Williams Lake

Okanagan

Kelowna

Penticton

Vernon

Kootenays

Cranbrook

Peace River

Dawson Creek

Fort St. John

Central Interior

Prince George

Northwest

Prince Rupert

Terrace

See also 
 Municipal elections in Canada

External links
 CBC coverage

References 

Municipal elections in British Columbia
British Columbia municipal
2005 in British Columbia